The 810th Separate Guards Order of Zhukov Naval Infantry Brigade named for the 60th Anniversary of the Soviet Union (810 gv. obrmp) (Military Unit Number 13140) is a brigade of the Russian Naval Infantry. It is based in Sevastopol with one battalion in Temryuk, the brigade is the naval infantry brigade of the Black Sea Fleet.

The brigade was formed as the 810th Separate Naval Infantry Regiment at Sevastopol in 1967 during the expansion of the Soviet Naval Infantry. It was expanded into the 810th Separate Naval Infantry Brigade in 1979, and remained stationed in Sevastopol as one of the Russian units based there under an agreement with Ukraine after the Soviet Union collapsed. In 1998, the brigade was reduced to a regiment again. It was expanded into a brigade again in 2008 and participated in the 2014 seizure of Crimea by Russia. It received Guards status in 2018.

Cold War 
The history of the unit began with the formation of the 309th Separate Naval Infantry Battalion of the Black Sea Fleet in accordance with a 30 April 1966 Ministry of Defense directive. The battalion was formed from the 1st Naval Infantry Battalion of the 336th Separate Guards Naval Infantry Regiment of the Baltic Fleet and also included personnel from the 135th Motor Rifle Regiment of the 295th Motor Rifle Division of the Transcaucasian Military District. Under the command of Colonel I. I. Sysolyatin, the battalion was the only naval infantry unit of the Black Sea Fleet. The battalion was expanded into the 810th Separate Naval Infantry Regiment on 15 December 1967, a date celebrated as the unit anniversary, with the absorption of the 1st Naval Infantry Battalion of the 336th Regiment and an amphibious tank company from the 61st Separate Naval Infantry Regiment of the Northern Fleet.

In 1967, naval infantry from the unit were first deployed to Egypt as a reinforced landing force under the command of Major N. Dobrynin. A reinforced naval infantry battalion departed for Egypt in May 1969 under the command of Lieutenant Colonel I. Orekhov. A reinforced naval infantry battalion participated in exercises with the Syrian Navy in 1972 under the command of Lieutenant Colonel A. Sapko. The regiment participated in the Okean maneuvers in May 1969 in Egypt and Syria, the mid-1971 Yug exercises, and in the fleet exercises Bereg-77 and Bereg-79. A tactical group participated in a mock amphibious landing in the Caspian Sea in July 1980.

The 810th completed its reorganization into the 810th Separate Naval Infantry Brigade on 20 November 1979, under the command of Lieutenant Colonel Vladimir Viktorovich Rublyov. As a separate naval infantry brigade, it was tasked with capturing and holding a beachhead, landing before the main forces, and assisting ground forces operating on the coast. A reinforced battalion from the brigade under the command of Major V. I. Rudenko participated in Exercise Zapad-81 in the Baltic Sea during July 1981, while another battalion group under the command of Lieutenant Colonel V. N. Abashkin participated in joint exercises with Syria. The brigade participated in the Shchit-82 strategic exercises and in June 1983 for the first time in the Black Sea Fleet the brigade conducted a live fire night airborne landing exercise.

Presented the Honorary Banner of the Military Council of the Soviet Navy and Komsomol Central Committee in 1983 and the Transferable Red Banner of the Military Council of the navy in 1985, for its training performance, the 810th was inspected by Marshal Viktor Kulikov in 1987. The brigade was praised by the Minister of Defense for its performance in the Osen-88 exercises. Elements of the brigade were involved in special combat missions from 10 July to 9 September 1989, 20 June to 16 August 1990, January to April 1990, October 1992, 23 September to 7 October 1993 and 2 to 20 November 1993 under the general command of Black Sea Fleet commander-in-chief Admiral Igor Kasatonov. During the 1991 August coup, the Black Sea Fleet command like much of the military leadership supported the coup of the State Emergency Committee, dispatching more than 500 naval infantrymen from the brigade with full combat gear to the Belbek airport on 20 August in order to prevent President Mikhail Gorbachev from being rescued from house arrest at his dacha in Foros. The naval infantrymen returned to their base after the failure of the coup and arrival of Vice President Alexander Rutskoy to free Gorbachev on 21 August.

Following the Black January 1990 repression of Azerbaijani nationalists in Baku, 525 naval infantrymen from the brigade, including the 880th and 882nd Separate Naval Infantry Battalions and a company of the 888th Separate Reconnaissance Battalion of the brigade, were sent into the city to enforce martial law, replacing Caspian Flotilla sailors manning checkpoints and guarding government buildings and military installations on 26 January; they returned to Sevastopol in early April. This deployment had a lasting impact on the Ukrainian commander of the 880th Battalion, Major Vitaily Rozhmanov, who explained that it was during the intervention in Baku that "we realized we were abandoned to fight with the Azerbaijani people, to perform police duties, to do everything to intimidate people, kill their national spirit and all faith and desire for freedom" when he and the 880th Battalion swore allegiance to Ukraine on 22 February 1992. In response, Kasatonov, determined to keep the fleet under Russian control, disbanded the battalion and dispersed its personnel. Those who chose Ukrainian allegiance would form the first Ukrainian Naval Infantry unit, the 1st Separate Naval Infantry Battalion, when the Ukrainian Navy was created on 1 July 1993.

Russian service 
The brigade participated in joint exercises with Georgia and joint exercises with Ukraine Si-Briz and Farvater mira in June 1994. That year, the authorities of Saratov Oblast signed a patronage agreement with the unit. It was reorganized as the 264th Separate Naval Infantry Regiment on 30 April 1998 but in response to unit veterans, it was renumbered as the 810th to preserve its old designation on 1 February 1999. A landing reconnaissance company of the brigade departed to fight in the Second Chechen War on 11 September 1999. Eight soldiers were killed during the war. 217 personnel were decorated for their actions, including Captain V. V. Karpushenko, made a Hero of Russia. A monument to the soldiers killed in Chechnya was unveiled at the base of the regiment on 25 November 2000.

Russian invasion of Ukraine 
The Brigade fought in the Siege of Mariupol that started on 24 February, in which the brigade was involved in the Battle of Azovstal. The brigade suffered heavy losses in Mariupol, with over 40 obituaries published in the Russian press and social media. The losses included brigade commander Colonel Aleksey Sharov, killed on 22 March. 
The Ukrainian General Staff on 17 April estimated brigade losses as 158 killed, about 500 wounded, and 70 missing. At least three naval infantryman of the brigade were killed in the shelling of Russian landing ships in Berdyansk on 24 March, including one confirmed aboard the landing ship Caesar Kunikov. 

Brigade deputy commander Colonel Alexei Berngard was made a Hero of the Russian Federation on 4 March for his leadership during the Battle of Volnovakha.

Black Sea Fleet deputy commander Major General Dmitry Pyatunin announced on 1 June that the awarding of the brigade with the honorific Mariupol in recognition of its role in the capture of the city was being considered.

References

Citations

Bibliography 
Michael Holm, 810th independent Naval Infantry Brigade [810-я отдельная бригада морской пехоты], https://www.ww2.dk/new/navy/810obrmp.htm.

Naval infantry brigades of Russia
Military units and formations established in 1979